The 240 mm trench mortar, or Mortier de 240 mm, was a large calibre mortar of World War I. An original French design, it was developed by Batignolles Company of Paris and introduced in 1915.

Service
The weapon was dismantled for transport, requiring four carts for the barrel, base, carriage and ammunition.

In action, a heavy timber platform was constructed embedded in the ground, on which the mortar base was immovably secured. The mortar carriage sat on the base and could traverse. The mortar barrel and breech were mounted on the carriage which provided elevation.

They were used in the "siege warfare" on the Western Front to destroy enemy strongpoints, bunkers and similar "hard" targets which were invulnerable to lighter mortars and field guns. The US Army handbook described it : "... the use for which it is primarily adapted is in the bombardment of strongly protected targets—dwellings, covered shelters, command posts, entrances to galleries, etc—or in the destruction of sectors of trenches, salients and the like.". Its effectiveness decreased late in the war as German policy changed to a lightly held frontline, hence decreasing available targets, and they became redundant when the war of movement resumed in mid-1918.

French use
The mortar was first introduced in 1915 as the Mortier de 240 mm CT (court de tranchee).

Its first major use was in the Champagne offensive of September 25, 1915.

This appears to be the bomb configuration adopted by US.

French estimates were 80 bombs needed to destroy a strong shelter with a roof of concrete or rails and concrete.

US use

David Lupton's Sons Co manufactured the weapon in the United States during World War I. They were used by nine trench mortar battalions of the Coast Artillery Corps.

The US version appears to have been a direct copy of the Mortier de 240 mm LT, i.e. with longer barrel and propellant charge loaded into the breech via a brass cartridge case, was also produced late in the war but it is doubtful whether any were actually used in combat. The December 1917 manual describes the weapon as "9.45 inch" but makes clear it is the French 240 mm they are describing that the US has adopted.

The March 1918 manual describes the Bomb, Model 1916, Type T, weight , explosive , length . Barrel and breech weighing , carriage , base , timber platform . Propellant charges of 800 grams Ballistite + 15 grams F-3 black powder for 750–1,400 meters, and 1250 grams Ballistite + 15 grams F-3 for 1,100–2,200 meters. This figure agrees with the charge quoted for the mortar in French use for maximum range.

"Separate loading ammunition" was used i.e. the mortar bomb was a separate unit from the propellant cartridge case, which was flanged, brass, 9.776 inches long x  diameter (248.3 by 169.4 mm). The bomb was loaded into the barrel muzzle. The cartridge containing propellant charge appropriate for the required range was loaded into the breech, similar to a howitzer.

The mortar was fired by pulling a lanyard, which triggered a primer in the base of the cartridge case and ignited the propellant charge in the cartridge. The cartridge cases could be reused after cleaning and replacing the primer.

Italian Use

Italy used both the French CT and LT versions and produced their own long barrel version.

Austro-Hungarian 24 cm Minenwerfer M.16 
Some 400 were copied and manufactured by Böhler during World War I based on examples captured from Italy, although the Austrians had problems recreating the original powder mixture and their shells suffered from large dispersions.

German 24 cm s.Flügelminenwerfer 

The US A.E.F. in France reported in March 1918 : "... a new pattern minenwerfer which was brought out in 1916 and looks very much like the French 240... uses a heavy bomb fitted with four vanes like the French 240 mm bombs. This bomb weighs  and contains  of explosive... ranges obtained vary from ". The specifications appear similar to the early French 240 mm CT quoted above. It is unknown whether this was related to the French or Austrian Böhler versions.

Notes and references

See also 
List of heavy mortars

Comparable weapons

25 cm schwere Minenwerfer German equivalent
9.45 inch Heavy Mortar British version

Surviving examples
A French LT example is displayed in the open at Place de Longueval, FranceBernard Plumier : Link to his web page which has details and photograph Direct link to photograph
The Central Museum of The Royal Regiment of Canadian Artillery, Shilo Manitoba German 24 cm minenwerfer

External links

French 240 mm
W L Ruffel, French Mortars of WW1
 List and pictures of World War I surviving 240 LT mortars
US 240 mm
The US manuals for the mortar appear to be based on French manuals e.g. the soldiers depicted are in French uniform.
"Handbook of the 9.45-inch trench mortar matériel" United States Ordnance Department. December 1917. Made available online by Combined Arms Research Library 
"Manual for trench artillery, United States Army (provisional). Part I, Trench Artillery.". Prepared at Headquarters AEF, France, March 1918. Made available online by Combined Arms Research Library 
 "Manual for trench artillery, United States Army (provisional). Part IV, 240 mm. trench mortar." Prepared at Headquarters AEF France March 1918. Includes range tables. Made available online by Combined Arms Research Library
"Provisional drill regulations for trench mortar batteries; 6" Newton and the 240mm. : chapters II, VI, and VIII". United States. War Dept, 1918. Made available online by Combined Arms Research Library
"Handbook on trench mortar fuzes, Mark VII and Mark VII-E.". United States. War Dept, 1918. Made available online by Combined Arms Research Library
German 240 mm
W L Ruffel, German Mortars of WW1
"Ingenieur-Komitee" Schwerer 24 cm Flügelminenwerfer
24 cm schwere Flügelminenwerfer (in Dutch)

World War I mortars of France
World War I mortars of Italy
Mortars of Austria-Hungary
Mortars of the United States
240 mm artillery